Vettathur  is a village in Malappuram district in the state of Kerala, India.

Demographics
At the 2001 India census, Vettathur had a population of 31,335.
It is a gramapanchayath in Malappuram and includes Vettathur and Karyavattam villages and the areas are Kappu Thelakkad Melkulangara Mannarmala and Shanthapuram.

Transportation
Vettathur village connects to other parts of India through Perinthalmanna town.  National highway No.66 passes through Tirur and the northern stretch connects to Goa and Mumbai.  The southern stretch connects to Cochin and Trivandrum. Highway No.966 goes to Palakkad and Coimbatore. The nearest airport is at Kozhikode.  The nearest major railway station is at Tirur.

Near places 
Kappu,
Thelakkad,
Melkulangara,
Pacheeri paara,
Moochikkal, Vengoor,
karyvattom(ezhu thala)

References

   Villages in Malappuram district
Perinthalmanna area